Matter waves are a central part of the theory of quantum mechanics, being an example of wave–particle duality. All matter exhibits wave-like behavior. For example, a beam of electrons can be diffracted just like a beam of light or a water wave. In most cases, however, the wavelength is too small to have a practical impact on day-to-day activities.

The concept that matter behaves like a wave was proposed by French physicist Louis de Broglie in 1924. It is also referred to as the de Broglie hypothesis. Matter waves are referred to as de Broglie waves.

The de Broglie wavelength is the wavelength, associated with a massive particle (i.e., a particle with mass, as opposed to a massless particle) and is related to its momentum, through the Planck constant, :

Wave-like behavior of matter was first experimentally demonstrated by George Paget Thomson's thin metal diffraction experiment, and independently in the Davisson–Germer experiment, both using electrons; and it has also been confirmed for other elementary particles, neutral atoms and even molecules. For  the de Broglie Wavelength value is the same as the Compton wavelength.

Historical context
At the end of the 19th century, light was thought to consist of waves of electromagnetic fields which propagated according to Maxwell's equations, while matter was thought to consist of localized particles (see history of wave and particle duality). In 1900, this division was exposed to doubt, when, investigating the theory of black-body radiation, Max Planck proposed that light is emitted in discrete quanta of energy. It was thoroughly challenged in 1905. Extending Planck's investigation in several ways, including its connection with the photoelectric effect, Albert Einstein proposed that light is also propagated and absorbed in quanta; now called photons. These quanta would have an energy given by the Planck–Einstein relation:

and a momentum

In the modern convention, frequency is symbolized by f as is done in the rest of this article. Einstein's postulate was confirmed experimentally by Robert Millikan and Arthur Compton over the next two decades.

De Broglie hypothesis 

De Broglie, in his 1924 PhD thesis, proposed that just as light has both wave-like and particle-like properties, electrons also have wave-like properties. De Broglie did not simplify his equation into the one that bears his name. He did conclude that . He also referred to Einstein’s famous relativity equation. Thus, it was a simple step to get to the equation that bears his name. Also, by rearranging the momentum equation stated in the above section, we find a relationship between the wavelength, associated with an electron and its momentum, through the Planck constant, :

The relationship has since been shown to hold for all types of matter: all matter exhibits properties of both particles and waves.

In 1926, Erwin Schrödinger published an equation describing how a matter wave should evolve – the matter wave analogue of Maxwell's equations — and used it to derive the energy spectrum of hydrogen. Frequencies of solutions of the non-relativistic Schrödinger equation differ from de Broglie waves by the Compton frequency since the energy corresponding to the rest mass of a particle is not part of the non-relativistic Schrödinger equation.

Experimental confirmation

Matter waves were first experimentally confirmed to occur in George Paget Thomson's cathode ray diffraction experiment and the Davisson-Germer experiment for electrons, and the de Broglie hypothesis has been confirmed for other elementary particles. Furthermore, neutral atoms and even molecules have been shown to be wave-like.

Electrons

In 1927 at Bell Labs, Clinton Davisson and Lester Germer fired slow-moving electrons at a crystalline nickel target. The angular dependence of the diffracted electron intensity was measured, and was determined to have the same diffraction pattern as those predicted by Bragg for x-rays. At the same time George Paget Thomson at the University of Aberdeen was independently firing electrons at very thin metal foils to demonstrate the same effect. Before the acceptance of the de Broglie hypothesis, diffraction was a property that was thought to be exhibited only by waves. Therefore, the presence of any diffraction effects by matter demonstrated the wave-like nature of matter. When the de Broglie wavelength was inserted into the Bragg condition, the predicted diffraction pattern was observed, thereby experimentally confirming the de Broglie hypothesis for electrons.

This was a pivotal result in the development of quantum mechanics. Just as the photoelectric effect demonstrated the particle nature of light, the Davisson–Germer experiment showed the wave-nature of matter, and completed the theory of wave–particle duality. For physicists this idea was important because it meant that not only could any particle exhibit wave characteristics, but that one could use wave equations to describe phenomena in matter if one used the de Broglie wavelength.

Neutral atoms

Experiments with Fresnel diffraction and an atomic mirror for specular reflection of neutral atoms confirm the application of the de Broglie hypothesis to atoms, i.e. the existence of atomic waves which undergo diffraction, interference and allow quantum reflection by the tails of the attractive potential. Advances in laser cooling have allowed cooling of neutral atoms down to nanokelvin temperatures. At these temperatures, the thermal de Broglie wavelengths come into the micrometre range. Using Bragg diffraction of atoms and a Ramsey interferometry technique, the de Broglie wavelength of cold sodium atoms was explicitly measured and found to be consistent with the temperature measured by a different method.

This effect has been used to demonstrate atomic holography, and it may allow the construction of an atom probe imaging system with nanometer resolution. The description of these phenomena is based on the wave properties of neutral atoms, confirming the de Broglie hypothesis.

The effect has also been used to explain the spatial version of the quantum Zeno effect, in which an otherwise unstable object may be stabilised by rapidly repeated observations.

Molecules
Recent experiments even confirm the relations for molecules and even macromolecules that otherwise might be supposed too large to undergo quantum mechanical effects. In 1999, a research team in Vienna demonstrated diffraction for molecules as large as fullerenes. The researchers calculated a De Broglie wavelength of the most probable C60 velocity as 2.5 pm.
More recent experiments prove the quantum nature of molecules made of 810 atoms and with a mass of 10,123 u. As of 2019, this has been pushed to molecules of 25,000 u.

Still one step further than Louis de Broglie go theories which in quantum mechanics eliminate the concept of a pointlike classical particle and explain the observed facts by means of wavepackets of matter waves alone.

De Broglie relations
The de Broglie equations relate the wavelength  to the momentum , and frequency  to the total energy  of a free particle:

where h is the Planck constant. The equations can also be written as

or 

 
In each pair, the second equation is also referred to as the Planck–Einstein relation, since it was also proposed by Planck and Einstein.

Special relativity
Using two formulas from special relativity, one for the relativistic mass energy and one for the relativistic momentum

allows the equations to be written as

where  denotes the particle's rest mass,  its velocity,  the Lorentz factor, and  the speed of light in vacuum. See below for details of the derivation of the de Broglie relations. Group velocity (equal to the particle's speed) should not be confused with phase velocity (equal to the product of the particle's frequency and its wavelength). In the case of a non-dispersive medium, they happen to be equal, but otherwise they are not.

Group velocity
Albert Einstein first explained the wave–particle duality of light in 1905.  Louis de Broglie hypothesized that any particle should also exhibit such a duality. The velocity of a particle, he concluded, should always equal the group velocity of the corresponding wave. The magnitude of the group velocity is equal to the particle's speed.

Both in relativistic and non-relativistic quantum physics, we can identify the group velocity of a particle's wave function with the particle velocity.  Quantum mechanics has very accurately demonstrated this hypothesis, and the relation has been shown explicitly for particles as large as molecules.

De Broglie deduced that if the duality equations already known for light were the same for any particle, then his hypothesis would hold.  This means that

where  is the total energy of the particle,  is its momentum,  is the reduced Planck constant. For a free non-relativistic particle it follows that

where  is the mass of the particle and  its velocity.

Also in special relativity we find that

where  is the velocity of the particle regardless of wave behavior.

Phase velocity
In quantum mechanics, particles also behave as waves with complex phases. The phase velocity is equal to the product of the frequency multiplied by the wavelength.

By the de Broglie hypothesis, we see that

Using relativistic relations for energy and momentum, we have

where E is the total energy of the particle (i.e., rest energy plus kinetic energy in the kinematic sense), p the momentum,  the Lorentz factor, c the speed of light, and β the speed as a fraction of c. The variable v can either be taken to be the speed of the particle or the group velocity of the corresponding matter wave. Since the particle speed  for any particle that has mass (according to special relativity), the phase velocity of matter waves always exceeds c, i.e.,

and as we can see, it approaches c when the particle speed is in the relativistic range. The superluminal phase velocity does not violate special relativity, because phase propagation carries no energy. See the article on Dispersion (optics) for details.

Four-vectors

Using four-vectors, the De Broglie relations form a single equation:

which is frame-independent.

Likewise, the relation between group/particle velocity and phase velocity is given in frame-independent form by:

where
Four-momentum 
Four-wavevector 
Four-velocity

Interpretations

The purpose of de Broglie’s 81 page thesis was to create an improved version of the Bohr atom through pilot wave theory. De Broglie presented his thesis on pilot wave theory at the 1927 Solvay Conference.

The thesis of de Broglie involved the hypothesis that a standing wave guided the electrons in the Bohr model of the atom. The thesis had an unusual analysis that higher energy photons obey the Wien Law and are particle-like while lower energy photons obey the Rayleigh–Jeans law and are wave-like. Particle physics tends to treat all forces by particle-particle interaction causing Richard Feynman to say that there are no waves just particles. And recently, there have been some theories that try to explain the Interpretations of quantum mechanics which try to resolve whether either the particle or the wave aspect is fundamental in nature, seeking to explain the other as an emergent property. Some interpretations, such as hidden variable theory, treat the wave and the particle as distinct entities. Yet others propose some intermediate entity that is neither quite wave nor quite particle but only appears as such when we measure one or the other property. The Copenhagen interpretation states that the nature of the underlying reality is unknowable and beyond the bounds of scientific inquiry.

Schrödinger's acknowledges that his quantum mechanical equation is based in part on the thesis of de Broglie. Schrödinger emphasized that his equation was different in that it was in multi-dimensional space. In his lecture as both wave mechanics and matrix mechanics were both new concepts, he tries to imply his formula is superior as does Heisenberg in his speech.

At the Fifth Solvay Conference in 1927, Erwin Schrödinger reported:

In 1955, Heisenberg showed that the waves of the quantum mechanical equations were reinterpreted as probabilities rather than classical waves stating:

It is mentioned above that the "displaced quantity" of the Schrödinger wave has values that are dimensionless complex numbers. According to Heisenberg, rather than being of some ordinary physical quantity such as, for example, Maxwell's electric field intensity, or mass density, the Schrödinger-wave packet's "displaced quantity" is a probability amplitude. He wrote that instead of using the term 'wave packet', it is preferable to speak of a probability packet. The Schrödinger equation probability amplitude is interpreted as the calculation of the probability of the location or momentum of discrete particles. Heisenberg recites Duane's account of particle diffraction by probabilistic quantal translation momentum transfer, which allows, for example in Young's two-slit experiment, each diffracted particle probabilistically to pass discretely through a particular slit. Schrödinger originally proposed that his matter wave was 'composed of smeared matter,’ but the Born rule changed the psi function to be understood as a description of probability rather than a description of the actual electron charge density.

These ideas may be expressed in ordinary language as follows. In the account of ordinary physical waves, a 'point' refers to a position in ordinary physical space at an instant of time, at which there is specified a 'displacement' of some physical quantity. But in the account of quantum mechanics, a 'point' refers to a configuration of the system at an instant of time, every particle of the system being in a sense present in every 'point' of configuration space, each particle at such a 'point' being located possibly at a different position in ordinary physical space. There is no explicit definite indication that, at an instant, this particle is 'here' and that particle is 'there' in some separate 'location' in configuration space. This conceptual difference entails that, in contrast to de Broglie's pre-quantum mechanical wave description, the quantum mechanical probability packet description does not directly and explicitly express the Aristotelian idea, referred to by Newton, that causal efficacy propagates through ordinary space by contact, nor the Einsteinian idea that such propagation is no faster than light. In contrast, these ideas are so expressed in the classical wave account, through the Green's function, though it is inadequate for the observed quantal phenomena. The physical reasoning for this was first recognized by Einstein.

De Broglie's phase wave and periodic phenomenon
De Broglie's thesis started from the hypothesis, "that to each portion of energy with a proper mass  one may associate a periodic phenomenon of the frequency , such that one finds: . The frequency  is to be measured, of course, in the rest frame of the energy packet. This hypothesis is the basis of our theory." (This frequency is also known as Compton frequency.)

De Broglie followed his initial hypothesis of a periodic phenomenon, with frequency , associated with the energy packet. He used the special theory of relativity to find, in the frame of the observer of the electron energy packet that is moving with velocity , that its frequency was apparently reduced to

 
De Broglie reasoned that to a stationary observer this hypothetical intrinsic particle periodic phenomenon appears to be in phase with a wave of wavelength  and frequency  that is propagating with phase velocity . De Broglie called this wave the "phase wave" («onde de phase» in French). 
This was his basic matter wave conception. He noted, as above, that , and the phase wave does not transfer energy.

While the concept of waves being associated with matter is correct, de Broglie did not leap directly to the final understanding of quantum mechanics with no missteps. There are conceptual problems with the approach that de Broglie took in his thesis that he was not able to resolve, despite trying a number of different fundamental hypotheses in different papers published while working on, and shortly after publishing, his thesis.
These difficulties were resolved by Erwin Schrödinger, who developed the wave mechanics approach, starting from a somewhat different basic hypothesis.

See also
 Bohr model
 Compton wavelength
 Faraday wave
 Kapitsa–Dirac effect
 Matter wave clock
 Schrödinger equation
 Theoretical and experimental justification for the Schrödinger equation
 Thermal de Broglie wavelength
 De Broglie–Bohm theory

References

Further reading
 L. de Broglie, Recherches sur la théorie des quanta (Researches on the quantum theory), Thesis (Paris), 1924; L. de Broglie, Ann. Phys. (Paris) 3, 22 (1925). English translation by A.F. Kracklauer.
 Broglie, Louis de, The wave nature of the electron Nobel Lecture, 12, 1929
 Tipler, Paul A. and Ralph A. Llewellyn (2003). Modern Physics. 4th ed. New York; W. H. Freeman and Co. . pp. 203–4, 222–3, 236.
 
 An extensive review article "Optics and interferometry with atoms and molecules" appeared in July 2009: https://web.archive.org/web/20110719220930/http://www.atomwave.org/rmparticle/RMPLAO.pdf.
 "Scientific Papers Presented to Max Born on his retirement from the Tait Chair of Natural Philosophy in the University of Edinburgh", 1953 (Oliver and Boyd)

External links
 

Waves
Matter
Foundational quantum physics